Kalak Bisheh may refer to:

Kalak Bisheh-ye Asad
Kalak Bisheh-ye Qahramani
Kalak Bisheh-ye Sadiq